The Arafak slender-toed gecko (Nactus arfakianus) is a species of lizard in the family Gekkonidae. It is endemic to Indonesia.

References

Nactus
Reptiles of Indonesia
Reptiles described in 1874
Endemic fauna of Indonesia